Kabiline is a large village in the Bignona Department of the Ziguinchor Region of southwestern Senegal. In 2002 the village had a population of 3258 people. Surrounded by rivers, it is connected by a road which leads to the N5 road, which connects it directly to the district seat of Diouloulou in the northwest.

In 1982 a group named Entente Kabiline emerged in the village. In the early 1990s several people were murdered in Kabiline, including Kalifa Didhiou, a former political prisoner, and Famara Mary, a peasant farmer who was executed on 24 June 1990 by soldiers.

The village contains Kabiline Primary School.

References

Populated places in the Bignona Department